Broomhill Hospital was a health facility in Kirkintilloch, East Dunbartonshire, Scotland.

History
The hospital, which was financed by a donation from Beatrice Clugston as a facility for incurable patients such as those with cancer, opened in 1876. The Lanfine Home for patients with tuberculosis was added in 1904. After joining the National Health Service in 1948, the hospital continued to care for chronically ill patients until it closed in 1995. The buildings, other than an old gatehouse, have been demolished and planning consent has been given for the site to be redeveloped for residential use.

References

Defunct hospitals in Scotland
Hospitals in East Dunbartonshire
Hospital buildings completed in 1876